Andrei Ovidiu Pițian (born 16 November 1995) is a Romanian footballer who plays as a centre-back for Liga I club Universitatea Cluj.

Honours

Pandurii Târgu Jiu
Cupa Ligii runner-up: 2014–15

Astra Giurgiu
Cupa României runner-up: 2016–17

Apollon Limassol
Cypriot Cup runner-up: 2017–18

References

External links
 
 

1995 births
Living people
Sportspeople from Târgu Jiu
Romanian footballers
Association football midfielders
Romania under-21 international footballers
Liga I players
CS Pandurii Târgu Jiu players
FC Astra Giurgiu players
FC Botoșani players
AFC Chindia Târgoviște players
FC Argeș Pitești players
FC Universitatea Cluj players
Cypriot First Division players
Apollon Limassol FC players
Romanian expatriate footballers
Romanian expatriate sportspeople in Cyprus
Expatriate footballers in Cyprus